Oghenekaro Peter Etebo (born 9 November 1995) is a Nigerian professional footballer who plays as a midfielder for Aris Thessaloniki, on loan from Stoke City, and the Nigeria national team.

Etebo started out at Warri Wolves where he spent three years before moving into European football with Portuguese side Feirense. He helped the side gain promotion to the Primeira Liga and established themselves as a top-flight club. Etebo had a six-month loan spell at Spanish side Las Palmas in the 2017–18 season. Etebo joined English side Stoke City in June 2018 for a fee of £6.35 million.

Club career

Warri Wolves
Etebo joined Warri Wolves in 2012, Etebo was announced as a member of the senior squad for the 2013 Nigeria Premier League season. However, due to his school studies and a delayed start to the league season, he only got to make his professional debut on 14 April 2013, announcing himself to Nigerian fans by scoring the first hat-trick of the season. With his goals in the 4th, 9th and 37th minutes and another by Joseph Osadiaye in the 12th minute as Wolves were up by four goals in the first half against El-Kanemi Warriors.

His excellent debut season continued when he scored the fastest hat-trick in the league in a 3–1 win against Wikki Tourists, scoring all three goals within 22 minutes of play. Etebo opened scoring for Wolves in the seventh minute of the game, but the celebrations had yet to die down when Waziri Christopher equalized for Wikki. Etebo struck again in the 12th minute to restore Wolves' lead, and he completed his hat-trick in the 29th minute, after the hosts were awarded a spot kick. In March 2014, he scored his first continental goal against Union Douala in the 2014 CAF Confederation Cup. His performances in the CAF Confederation Cup got the attention of Tunisian club Espérance and Egyptian side Zamalek, sparking a fight over his signature. In May 2014 Etebo had a trial at Italian club Udinese.

In 2015 Etebo received the Glo Wondergoal award, for the best goal of the 2015 Nigeria Professional Football League season, which was scored against Bayelsa United. On 7 January 2016, he won the Most Promising Talent of the Year award at the CAF Awards in Abuja, Nigeria. In total Etebo scored 23 goals in 64 league games for Warri Wolves in his three years with the club.

Feirense
Etebo joined Portuguese LigaPro club Feirense in early 2016, he played four times in 2015–16, scoring once helping them to gain promotion to the Primeira Liga. He played 27 times in 2016–17 as Feirense finished in eight position narrowly misses out on a European place by two points.

Las Palmas (loan)
On 31 January 2018, Etebo was loaned to La Liga side UD Las Palmas for six months, with a buyout clause. Etebo played 14 matches with Las Palmas but was unable to prevent them being relegated. Etebo earned praise for his performances with the Canary Islands side.

Stoke City
On 11 June 2018, Etebo signed for EFL Championship side Stoke City for €7.2million (£6.35 million) from Feirense on a five-year-deal. He became new manager Gary Rowett's first signing at Stoke, who described him as an 'energetic midfielder'. Etebo revealed that he turned down offers from Premier League clubs before joining Stoke. He made his Stoke debut on 5 August 2018 against Leeds United. Etebo played 37 times in 2018–19 and was one of the teams's better performers as Stoke finished in 16th position. He scored twice both of which were powerful strikes against Nottingham Forest and Blackburn Rovers.

Etebo had a delayed start to the 2019–20 season due to his involvement with Nigeria at the 2019 Africa Cup of Nations. Stoke began the season in terrible form and found themselves in the Championship relegation places which cost manager Nathan Jones his job in November 2019. Under new manager Michael O'Neill, Etebo was dropped from the squad with O'Neill critical of his efforts in training. This lead him to being linked with a move away from the club in January 2020.

In January 2020, Etebo joined La Liga side Getafe on loan for the remainder of the 2019–20 season with an option to purchase. Etebo played 11 times for Getafe scoring once against SD Eibar but the club decided against activating their purchase option.

On 9 September 2020, Etebo joined Turkish side Galatasaray on loan for the 2020–21 season. He played 29 times for Galatasary as they finished in second place, missing out on the title to Beşiktaş on goal difference.

On 9 July 2021, Etebo joined newly promoted Premier League side Watford on a season-long loan deal with an option to buy.
On 14 August 2021, he made his competitive debut for Watford in their league opener against Aston Villa, where Watford won 3–2. Etebo struggled with injuries in 2021–22, making ten appearances for the Hornets as they suffered relegation from the Premier League and at the end of the season they decided against signing him on a permanent basis.

Aris Thessaloniki
On 15 September 2022, Etebo joined Greek side Aris Thessaloniki on a season-long loan.

International career
Etebo made his international debut on 27 July 2013 against Côte d'Ivoire in a 2–0 loss in Abidjan during the 2014 African Nations Championship qualification campaign for home-based players. He also played against Jordan in an international friendly on 23 October 2013. In December 2015, he helped the Nigerian U-23 Team to the U-23 Africa Cup of Nations triumph in Senegal; finishing top scorer with five goals, including a brace in a 2–1 win against Algeria in the final. Both goals were characterized by deep runs from his team's own half. Having almost single-handedly guaranteed Nigeria's qualification to the Olympic games, he was subsequently selected by Nigeria in the 35-man provisional squad for the 2016 Summer Olympics. Following a tumultuous arrival in Brazil, he scored four goals against Japan in Nigeria's opening group match. The game ended 5–4 to Nigeria. Injured in the third game of the tournament, he played a lessened part in the run of the team to a bronze medal finish. Etebo is a member of the full Nigeria national team.

Etebo was named in Nigeria's 23-man squad for the 2018 World Cup in Russia. He started all three of Nigeria's group matches which saw them beat Iceland but lose to Argentina and Croatia which meant that they failed to progress to the knock-out stages.

Career statistics

Club

International

Scores and results list Nigeria's goal tally first, score column indicates score after each Etebo goal.

Honours
Nigeria U23
 Olympic Bronze Medal: 2016

References

External links

Living people
1995 births
Association football midfielders
Sportspeople from Lagos
Nigerian footballers
Nigeria international footballers
2015 Africa U-23 Cup of Nations players
C.D. Feirense players
Warri Wolves F.C. players
UD Las Palmas players
Stoke City F.C. players
Getafe CF footballers
Galatasaray S.K. footballers
Watford F.C. players
Aris Thessaloniki F.C. players
Primeira Liga players
Liga Portugal 2 players
Nigeria Professional Football League players
La Liga players
English Football League players
Süper Lig players
Super League Greece players
Footballers at the 2016 Summer Olympics
Olympic footballers of Nigeria
Expatriate footballers in Portugal
Expatriate footballers in Spain
Expatriate footballers in Turkey
Nigerian expatriate footballers
Nigerian expatriate sportspeople in Portugal
Medalists at the 2016 Summer Olympics
Olympic bronze medalists for Nigeria
Olympic medalists in football
African Games bronze medalists for Nigeria
African Games medalists in football
2018 FIFA World Cup players
Nigerian expatriate sportspeople in England
Nigerian expatriate sportspeople in Greece
Expatriate footballers in England
Expatriate footballers in Greece
Competitors at the 2015 African Games
2019 Africa Cup of Nations players
Premier League players